Coptosia nigrosuturata is a species of beetle in the family Cerambycidae. It was described by Leopold Heyrovský in 1950. It is known from Israel.

References

Saperdini
Beetles described in 1950